Apple Watch is a line of smartwatches produced by Apple Inc. It incorporates fitness tracking, health-oriented capabilities, and wireless telecommunication, and integrates with iOS and other Apple products and services. The Apple Watch was released in April 2015, and quickly became the best-selling wearable device: 4.2 million were sold in the second quarter of fiscal 2015, and more than 101 million people were estimated to use an Apple Watch as of December 2020. Apple has introduced a new generation of the Apple Watch with improved internal components each September—each labeled by Apple as a 'Series', with certain exceptions.

Each Series has been initially sold in multiple variants defined by the watch casing's material, color, and size (except for the budget watches Series 1 and SE, available only in aluminum, and the Ultra, available only in 49 mm uncolored titanium), and beginning with Series 3, by the option in the aluminum variants for LTE cellular connectivity, which comes standard with the other materials. The band included with the watch can be selected from multiple options from Apple, and watch variants in aluminum co-branded with Nike and in stainless steel co-branded with Hermès are also offered, which include exclusive bands, colors, and digital watch faces carrying those companies' branding.

The Apple Watch operates in conjunction with the user's iPhone for functions such as configuring the watch and syncing data with iPhone apps, but can separately connect to a Wi-Fi network for data-reliant purposes, including communications, app use, and audio streaming. LTE-equipped models can also perform these functions over a mobile network, and can make and receive phone calls independently when the paired iPhone is not nearby or is powered-off, substantially reducing the need for an iPhone after initial setup. The oldest iPhone model that is compatible with any given Apple Watch depends on the version of system software installed on each device. , new Apple Watches come with watchOS 9 preinstalled and require an iPhone running iOS 16, which is available for the iPhone 8 and later.

Development 
The goal of the Apple Watch was to complement an iPhone and add new functions, and to free people from their phones. 

Kevin Lynch was hired by the Apple to make wearable technology for the wrist. He said: "People are carrying their phones with them and looking at the screen so much. People want that level of engagement. But how do we provide it in a way that's a little more human, a little more at the moment when you're with somebody?" Apple's development process was held under wraps until a Wired article revealed how some internal design decisions were made.

Rumors as far back as 2011 speculated that Apple was developing a wearable variation of the iPod that would curve around the user's wrist, and feature Siri integration. In February 2013, The New York Times and The Wall Street Journal reported that Apple was beginning to develop an iOS-based smartwatch with a curved display. That same month, Bloomberg reported that Apple's smartwatch project was "beyond the experimentation phase" with a team of about 100 designers. In July 2013, Financial Times reported that Apple had begun hiring more employees to work on the smartwatch, and that it was targeting a retail release in late 2014.

Unveiling and release 

In April 2014, Apple CEO Tim Cook told The Wall Street Journal that the company was planning to launch new products that year, but revealed no specifics. 

In June 2014, Reuters reported that production was expected to begin in July for an October release.

During a September 2014 press event where the iPhone 6 was also presented, the new watch product was introduced by Tim Cook. After a video focusing on the design process, Cook reappeared on stage wearing an Apple Watch.

In comparison to other Apple products and competing smartwatches, marketing of the Apple Watch promoted the device as a fashion accessory. Apple later focused on its health and fitness-oriented features, in an effort to compete with dedicated activity trackers. The watchOS 3 added fitness tracking for wheelchair users, social sharing in the Activity app, and a Breathe app to facilitate mindfulness.

The device was not branded as "iWatch", which would have put it in line with its product lines such as iPod, iPhone, and iPad. In the United States, the "iWatch" trademark is owned by OMG Electronics – who was crowdfunding a device under the same name; it is owned in the European Union by Irish firm Probendi. In July 2015, Probendi sued Apple Inc. for trademark infringement, arguing that through keyword advertising on the Google search engine, it caused advertising for the Apple Watch to appear on search results pages when users searched for the trademarked term "iWatch".

Release 
Pre-orders for the Apple Watch began on April 10, 2015, with the official release on April 24. Initially, it was not available at the Apple Store; customers could make appointments for demonstrations and fitting, but the device was not in-stock for walk-in purchases and had to be reserved and ordered online. CNET felt that this distribution model was designed to prevent Apple Store locations from having long line-ups due to the high demand. The first ever retail store to display the Apple Watch to the public was Colette in Paris. Later on, selected models were available in limited quantities at luxury boutiques and authorized resellers. 

On June 4, 2015, Apple announced that it planned to stock Apple Watch models at its retail locations. 

On August 24, 2015, Best Buy announced that it would begin stocking Apple Watch at its retail stores by the end of September. Both T-Mobile US and Sprint also announced plans to offer Apple Watch through their retail stores.

In September 2015, Apple launched a new subset of Apple Watch, with a stainless steel body and leather band, in collaboration with Hermès. The following year, Apple launched another subset of Apple Watches in collaboration with Nike dubbed "Apple Watch Nike+". Both subsets featured cosmetic customization, but otherwise functioned like standard Apple Watches.

Apple Watch went on sale in India in November 2015. The device also launched in Chile, the Philippines, Indonesia, and South Africa.

Specifications

Design and materials 

Each series of Apple Watch is offered in multiple variants, distinguished by the casing's material, color, and size, with special bands and digital watch faces available for certain variants co-branded with Nike and Hermès, which are also sometimes accompanied by other unique extras, like stainless steel charging pucks, premium packaging, and exclusive color basic bands.

Originally at launch, the Apple Watch was marketed as one of three "collections", designating the case material. In order of increasing cost, the collections were:
 Apple Watch Sport (Aluminium case)
 Apple Watch (Stainless steel case)
 Apple Watch Edition (Originally released as an 18kt gold casing with newer materials in later models)
Starting with Series 1/Series 2, Apple dropped the "Sport" moniker from the branding (apart from the sport bands), and the Apple Watch was available with either an aluminum (lowest cost) or stainless steel case. "Apple Watch Edition" branding still exists, but now refers to watch casings made from ceramic or titanium.

Apple did not explicitly market the first-generation Apple Watch as being waterproof, stating that it can withstand splashes of water (such as rain and hand washing), but does not recommend submersion (IPX7). Apple introduced a higher level of water resistance with the release of the Apple Watch Series 2, and the device was explicitly advertised as being suitable for swimming and surfing. The Series 7 also includes an IP6X certification for dust resistance.

Size 
Since the introduction of the Apple Watch, it has been available in two sizes, primarily affecting screen resolution and area.

The overall shape and width of the watch has not changed significantly since its release, so customizable bands and accessories are typically compatible with any Apple Watch of the same size class. Bands that fit the smaller size class (and  watches) and larger size class (and  watches) are generally interchangeable within the class. The casing of the watch includes a mechanism to allow the user to change the straps without special tools.

Input and sensors 

For input, the Watch features a "digital crown" on one side which can be turned to scroll or zoom content on screen, and pressed to return to the home screen. Next to the crown (on the same side of the watch) is the Side Button, which can be used to display recently used apps and access Apple Pay, which is used for contactless payment. The Watch also prominently features a touchscreen; prior to Series 6/SE, the screen included Force Touch technology, which enabled the display to become pressure-sensitive and therefore capable of distinguishing between a tap and a press for displaying contextual menus. Force Touch has since been physically removed in Watch Series 6 and Watch SE, and has been disabled via software on Watch Series 5 and earlier on models supporting watchOS 7.

Additional sensors integrated into the Watch include an accelerometer, gyroscope, and barometer, which are used to determine device orientation, user movement, and altitude. The back of all Apple Watches are equipped with a Heart Rate Monitor, which projects infrared and green light from light-emitting diodes (LEDs) onto the user's skin and photodiodes measure the varying amount of light reflected. Because blood absorbs green light and reflects red light, the amounts of each type of reflected light are compared to determine heart rate. The Watch adjusts the sampling rate and LED brightness as needed. Starting with the Series 4, Apple added electrical sensors to the Digital Crown and back, allowing the Watch to take electrocardiogram (ECG) readings; the device won FDA clearance in October 2018, becoming the first consumer device capable of taking an ECG. A blood oxygen monitor was added with the Series 6 in 2020, albeit as a "wellness" device not capable of diagnosing a medical condition. The blood oxygen monitor added red LEDs to the back, allowing the watch to determine oxygen levels by measuring blood color. The Watch SE reverted to the capabilities of the Series 3, dropping the electrical sensors and blood oxygen monitor.

Battery 
Apple rates the device's battery for 18 hours of mixed usage. Apple Watch is charged by means of inductive charging. If the watch's battery depletes to less than 10 percent, the user is alerted and offered to enable Low Power Mode, which allows the user to continually use the watch while some features are disabled. The watch then reverts to its original mode when the battery is sufficiently charged.

Bands 
Apple Watch comes with an included band (strap) to attach it to the user's wrist. The band can be easily changed to other types by holding down the connectors on the bottom of the watch and sliding the band pieces out. Third party bands are compatible with Apple Watch; Apple produces bands in a variety of materials and colours. Bands designed for the original Series 1-3 38 mm and 42 mm case sizes are compatible with the Series 4-6 40 mm and 44 mm cases, as well as the Series 7 41 mm and 45 mm cases, respectively.

Starting with Apple Watch Series 5, Apple introduced the online Apple Watch Studio which allows customers to mix and match bands on purchase, eliminating the need to purchase a specific combination of case and band design, and allows for a simplification of packaging (since Apple Watch Series 4 in 2018).

Hardware

First generation 

The 1st generation Apple Watch (colloquially referred to as Series 0) uses the single-core S1 system-on-chip. It does not have a built-in GPS chip, instead relying on a paired iPhone for location services. It features a new linear actuator hardware from Apple called the "Taptic Engine", providing realistic haptic feedback when an alert or a notification is received, and is used for other purposes by certain apps. The watch is equipped with a built-in heart rate sensor, which uses both infrared and visible-light LEDs and photodiodes.

All versions of the first-generation Apple Watch have 8 GB of storage; the operating system allows the user to store up to 2 GB of music and 75 MB of photos. When the Apple Watch is paired with an iPhone, all music on that iPhone is also available to be controlled and accessed from the Apple Watch. Software support for the first Apple Watch ended with watchOS 4.3.2.

Second generation (Series 1 and 2) 

The second generation Apple Watch has two models; the Apple Watch Series 1 and Apple Watch Series 2.

The Series 1 has a variant of the dual-core Apple S2 processor with GPS removed, known as the Apple S1P. It has a lower starting price than first generation. The Series 1 was sold only in Aluminium casings.

The Series 2 has the dual-core Apple S2 processor, water resistance to 50 meters, a display twice as bright, at 1000 nits, and a GPS receiver. The Series 2 was sold in casings of anodized Aluminium, Stainless Steel and Ceramic.

The Apple Watch Edition Series 2 is the first Apple Watch model to add the new White ceramic case color option. Both Yellow Gold and Rose Gold 18K gold case color options have been removed.

The Apple Watch Nike+ Series 2 is the first Apple Watch model available as the Nike, Inc. collaborate special option.

The Apple Watch Series 1 and Apple Watch Series 2 are the final Apple Watch models available with Yellow Gold and Rose Gold aluminum case color options.They have an advertised 18 hours of battery life.

The software support for both Apple Watch Series 1 and Apple Watch Series 2 ended with watchOS 6.3.

Third generation (Series 3) 

The Apple Watch Series 3 features a faster processor, the dual-core S3, Bluetooth 4.2 (compared to 4.0 on older models), a built-in altimeter for measuring flights of stairs climbed, increased RAM size, and is available in a variant with LTE cellular connectivity. Siri is able to speak through the onboard speaker on Apple Watch Series 3 due to the increased processing speed of the Watch.

Series 3 features LTE cellular connectivity for the first time in an Apple Watch, enabling users to make phone calls, iMessage and stream Apple Music and Podcasts directly on the watch, independent of an iPhone. The LTE model contains an eSIM and shares the same mobile number as the user's iPhone.

The Apple Watch Series 3 is the first Apple Watch model to add the new Gold aluminum case color option to match the color introduced with the iPhone 8 in 2017. Both Yellow Gold and Rose Gold aluminum case color options have been removed. It is now available in Space Gray, Silver and Gold aluminum case color options, available in Space Black and Silver stainless steel case color options.

The Apple Watch Edition Series 3 is the first and only Apple Watch model to add the new Gray ceramic case color option. It is available in White and Gray ceramic case color.

The software support for the Apple Watch Series 3 ended with watchOS 8.7.1.

Fourth generation (Series 4) 

The Apple Watch Series 4 is the first predominant redesign of the Apple Watch, featuring larger displays with thinner bezels and rounded corners, and a slightly rounder, thinner chassis with a redesigned ceramic back. Internally there is a new S4 64-bit dual-core processor, capable of up to double the S3's performance, upgraded 16 GB storage, and a new electrical heart sensor. The microphone was moved to the opposite side between the side button and the digital crown to improve call quality. Other changes include the digital crown incorporating haptic feedback with the Apple Haptic Engine and includes the new Apple-designed W3 wireless chip.

The ECG system has received clearance from the United States Food and Drug Administration, a first ever for a consumer device, and is supported by the American Heart Association. The Series 4 can also detect falls, and can automatically contact emergency services unless the user cancels the outgoing call.

The watch received mostly positive reviews from critics. TechRadar gave it a score of 4.5/5, calling it one of the top smartwatches, while criticizing the short battery life. Digital Trends gave it a score of 5/5, calling it Apple's best product and praising the design, build quality, and software, among others, while criticizing the battery life. CNET gave it a score of 8.2/10, calling it the "best overall smartwatch around", while criticizing the battery life and lack of watch face options. T3 gave it a score of 5/5, calling it a "truly next-gen smartwatch" due to its thinner body and bigger screen compared to the Series 3, and health features.

The Apple Series 4 is the first Apple Watch model to add the new Gold stainless steel color option to match the color introduced with the iPhone XS in 2018. It is now available in Space Gray, Silver and Gold aluminum case color options, available in Space Black, Silver and Gold stainless steel case color options. All the ceramic case color options have been removed until the launch of the Apple Watch Edition Series 5 in 2019.

Fifth generation (Series 5 & SE (1st gen)) 

The Apple Watch Series 5 was announced on September 10, 2019. Its principal improvements over its predecessor were the addition of a compass and an always-on display with a low-power display driver capable of refresh rates as low as once per second. Additional new features include International Emergency Calling, enabling emergency calls in over 150 countries, a more energy-efficient S5 processor, improved ambient light sensor, and storage doubled to 32 GB. The release of the Series 5 also brought back the "Edition" model, with a ceramic model absent from the previous generation. A new titanium model was also included in two colors: natural and Space Black.

At its September 2020 product introduction event, Apple also announced the Apple Watch SE, a lower-cost model. The SE incorporates the same always-on altimeter as the Series 6, but uses the previous-generation S5 processor and previous- (i.e. second) generation optical heart rate sensor; does not include ECG and blood oximeter sensors or an always-on display; and does not include UWB or 5 GHz Wi-Fi communication capabilities.

The Series 5 and above (including the SE model introduced in 2020) also incorporate enhanced hardware- and software-based battery and performance management functionality.

Critics generally gave it a positive review. CNET gave it a score of 4/5, concluding, "The Apple Watch continues to be one of the best smartwatches, but it remains limited by being an iPhone accessory for now." Digital Trends gave it a score of 4.5/5. The Verge gave it a score of 9/10.

The Apple Watch Series 5 is now available in Space Gray, Silver and Gold aluminum case color options, available in Space Black, Silver and Gold stainless steel case color options.

The Apple Watch Edition Series 5 is the final Apple Watch model available with White ceramic case color option. It is the first Apple Watch model to add the new Natural and Space Black titanium case color options. It is now available in White ceramic case color option, available in Natural and Space Black titanium case color options.

The 1st-generation Apple Watch SE is the final Apple Watch model available with Space Gray and Gold (introduced with iPhone 8 in 2017) case color options. It is now available with Space Gray, Silver and Gold case color options.

Sixth generation (Series 6) 

The Apple Watch Series 6 was announced on September 15, 2020, during an Apple Special Event and began shipping on September 18. Its principal improvement over its predecessor is the inclusion of a sensor to monitor blood oxygen saturation.

Additional features include a new S6 processor that is up to 20% faster than the S4 and S5, a 2.5× brighter always-on display, and an always-on altimeter. The S6 incorporates an updated, third generation optical heart rate sensor and also enhanced telecommunication technology, including support for ultra-wideband (UWB) via Apple's U1 chip, and the ability to connect to 5 GHz Wi-Fi networks. The Series 6 watch was updated with faster charging hardware such that it completes charging in ~1.5 hours. Force Touch hardware was removed, consistent with the removal of all Force Touch functionality from watchOS 7.

The Apple Watch Series 6 is the final Apple Watch model available with Space Gray and Gold (introduced with the iPhone 8 in 2017) aluminum case color options. It is the first time adding the Product Red and Blue aluminum case color options. It is available in Space Gray, Silver, Gold, Blue and Product Red aluminum case color options, available in Graphite, Silver and Gold stainless steel case color options. The Gold stainless steel case color option is now in classic yellow gold and the Graphite stainless steel case color option is the new color replacing Space Black color before the introduction with the iPhone 12 Pro in 2020.

The Apple Watch Edition Series 6 is now available in Natural and Space Black titanium case color options. The ceramic case option was removed.

Seventh generation (Series 7) 

The Apple Watch Series 7 was announced on September 14, 2021, during an Apple Special Event. Pre-orders opened on October 8, with earliest shipping dates starting on October 15.

Enhancements relative to the prior-generation Series 6 watch include a more rounded design with a case 1 mm larger than the Series 6; a display that is 70% brighter indoors and approximately 20% larger; improved durability via a crack-resistant front crystal; IP6X certification for resistance to dust; 33% faster charging via improved internal electronics and an enhanced, USB-C based fast-charging cable; support for BeiDou (China's satellite navigation system); and the availability of an on-screen keyboard that can be tapped or swiped. The Series 7 is also equipped with new hardware that enables ultra-rapid, short-range wireless data transfer at 60.5 GHz, though Apple has not fully explained this new functionality.

The Apple Watch Edition Series 7 is the final Apple Watch model to be available in Natural and Space Black titanium case color options.

The Apple Watch Series 7 is now available in Midnight, Starlight, Blue, Green and Product Red aluminum case color option, available in Graphite, Silver and Gold (introduced with the Apple Watch Series 6 and the iPhone 12 Pro in 2020) stainless steel case color option. Both Space Gray and Gold (introduced with iPhone 8 in 2017) aluminum case color options have been removed. The Silver aluminum case color option have been removed until the launch of the Apple Watch Series 8 in 2022.

Eighth generation (Series 8, SE (2nd gen) & Ultra) 

The Apple Watch Series 8, the second-generation Apple Watch SE, and Apple Watch Ultra were announced on September 7, 2022, during an Apple Special Event. Pre-orders opened on the same day, with the Series 8 and 2nd gen SE shipping on September 16, while the Ultra ships on September 23.

Enhancements in the Series 8, relative to the prior-generation Series 7 watch, include a new temperature sensor and more precise accelerometers and gyroscopes capable of detecting the occurrence of a car crash.

Aluminum case models are available in Midnight, Silver, Starlight and Product Red, and the stainless steel models are available in Silver, Graphite and Gold. The Blue and Green case colors are discontinued, and the Series 8 is not available with a titanium case.

The Apple Watch Ultra is the first Apple Watch model to feature a new tough and rugged titanium casing in natural finish, a larger 49 mm case size, a flat sapphire front crystal, and an additional orange Action button located on the opposite side of the Digital Crown and Side Button. It is designed for extreme activities like endurance sports, elite athletes, trailblazing, adventure, ocean, and water sports.

The 2nd-generation Apple Watch SE is available in Midnight, Silver and Starlight case color options. The Space Gray and Gold case color options have been discontinued.

Software 
Apple Watch runs watchOS, whose interface is based around a home screen with circular app icons, which can be changed to a list view in the devices settings. The OS can be navigated using the touchscreen or the crown on the side of the watch. During its debut, the first generation Apple Watch needed to be paired with an iPhone 5 or later running iOS 8.2 or later; this version of iOS introduced the Apple Watch app, which is used to pair the watch with an iPhone, customize settings and loaded apps, and highlight compatible apps from the App Store.

The Apple Watch is capable of receiving notifications, messages, and phone calls via a paired iPhone. "Glances" allowed users to swipe between pages containing widget-like displays of information; however, this feature was replaced by a new Control Center. watchOS also supports Handoff to send content from Apple Watch to an iOS or macOS device, and act as a viewfinder for an iPhone camera, Siri is also available for voice commands, and is capable of responding with voice prompts on the Series 3 watches. Apple Watch also supports Apple Pay, and enables its use with older iPhone models that do not contain near-field communication (NFC) support.

Apple Watch's default apps are designed to interact with their iOS counterparts, such as Mail, Phone, Calendar, Messages, Maps, Music, Photos, Reminders, Remote (which can control iTunes and Apple TV), Stocks, and Wallet. Using the Activity and Workout apps, a user can track their physical activity and send data back to the iPhone for use in its Health app and other HealthKit-enabled software. With watchOS 3, Reminders, Home, Find My Friends, Heart Rate, and Breathe were added to the stock apps.

With the release of watchOS 4 and the Series 3 Apple Watch, iPhone 5 and iPhone 5C support was dropped, requiring users to use an iPhone 5S or later with iOS 11 or later to use watchOS 4. Apple Watches still running watchOS 3 or below remain compatible with the iPhone 5 and iPhone 5C. Further, watchOS 5 dropped support for the original (Series 0) Apple Watch. watchOS 6 was the final version to support the Series 1 and Series 2 Apple Watch. It dropped support for the iPhone 5S, iPhone 6, and iPhone 6 Plus, requiring users to use an iPhone 6S or later with iOS 13 or later. watchOS 8 was the final version to support the Apple Watch Series 3. watchOS 9 dropped support for the Apple Watch Series 3, iPhone 6S, iPhone 6S Plus, first-generation iPhone SE, iPhone 7, and iPhone 7 Plus, requiring users to use an iPhone 8 or later with iOS 16 or later paired with an Apple Watch SE, Apple Watch Series 4 or later.

Version history 

At WWDC 2015, Tim Cook announced watchOS 2.0; described by CNET as a "significant revamp", it included a new software development kit that allows more direct access to the device's hardware, new watch faces, the ability to reply to an e-mail, and other features. WatchOS 2.0 was released in September 2015. Following the software update, some users experienced issues with lag.

watchOS 3.0 was announced at WWDC 2016, with a priority on performance. Users are able to keep apps running in memory as well as receive background updates and refreshed information. Other updates include a new Dock invoked with the side button to replace the performance-laden Glances, an updated Control Center, and new reply options on Messages. Several new watch faces have also been added, including Minnie Mouse, along with the ability to switch watch faces from the lock screen simply by swiping. A new feature called SOS allows users to hold the dock button to make a call to the local emergency line and pull up the user's Medical ID. Another feature is Activity Sharing, which allows sharing of workouts with friends and even sending their heartbeats to one another. A new app called Breathe guides users through breathing exercises throughout the day, with visuals and haptic feedback. It was made available to the public in September 2016.

watchOS 3.1 was released to the public in October 2016, and watchOS 3.2 was released in March 2017. Both updates added minor improvements and bug fixes.

WatchOS 4.0 was announced at WWDC 2017 and released to the public in September 2017. WatchOS 4 features a proactive Siri watch face, personalized activity coaching, and an entirely redesigned music app. It also introduces Apple GymKit, a technology platform to connect workouts with cardio equipment.

WatchOS 4.3 was released in March 2018. It introduced support for Nightstand mode in portrait orientation. It brought back the ability for music playing on the iPhone to be controlled using the Music app on the Apple Watch and also enabled control of playback and volume on Apple's HomePod. Other new features included a new charging animation and a new app loading animation. Activity data was added to the Siri watch face, and the battery complication more accurately reports battery life.

watchOS 5.0 was first shown to the public at the San Jose WWDC developer conference held by Apple. It introduced an instant watch-to-watch walkie-talkie mode, all-new Podcasts app, raise-wrist-to-speak Siri, customizable Control Center, and the ability to access the notification center and control center from apps. Other features included support for WebKit to view web pages, six new watch faces, and new workout running features. It was released to the public in September 2018. On the newest release of watchOS beta the sleep feature was shown on screen, this would eliminate the need to use third-party apps.

watchOS 6.0 was released to the public in September 2019. It introduced more native iOS apps such as voice memos, calculator, and a native watchOS app store. watchOS 6.0 also introduced new features such as the noise app that allows you to measure the sound around you in decibels, menstrual tracking, and new watch faces. Other features include Siri being able to tell users what music they are listening to, activity trends, and a new UI framework for developers.

watchOS 7.0 was announced on June 22, 2020, at the WWDC, and released on September 16, 2020; new functionalities include sleep tracking, additional watch faces, handwashing detection and new workouts such as dancing.

watchOS 8.0 was announced on June 7, 2021, at the WWDC, and released on September 20, 2021. It replaces the Breathe app with a new Mindfulness app, and adds a Focus mode as well as a Portrait Watch Face, updates to the Messages and Home apps, Contacts and Find My apps, and a redesigned Photos app.

watchOS 9.0 was released to public on September 13, 2022. It enhances the Workout display with new views of metrics like Activity rings, Heart Rate Zones, Power, and Elevation. It also support better sleep tracking and additional watch faces.

Third-party apps 
In watchOS 1, third-party WatchKit applications run in the background on the iPhone as an application extension while a set of native user interface resources are installed on Apple Watch. Thus, watchOS apps must be bundled within their respective iOS app, and are synced to the watch either manually, or automatically upon installation of the phone app.

With the release of watchOS 2, Apple made it mandatory for new watch apps to be developed with the watchOS 2 SDK from June 1, 2016, onwards; no third-party languages or SDKs can be used to develop apps. This allowed for developers to create native apps that are run on the watch itself, thus improving the responsiveness of third-party apps.

In watchOS 5 and earlier, all watchOS apps are dependent apps – the watchOS app relies on an iOS companion app in order to function properly. In watchOS 6 or later, developers are able to create completely independent watchOS apps, and no longer require an app to be installed on the paired iPhone. This was assisted by the introduction of a separate App Store on the Apple Watch itself.

Models 

As of September 2021, eight generations and eight series of Apple Watch have been released.

Apple Watch models have been divided into five "collections": Apple Watch (1st generation-present), Apple Watch Sport (1st generation), Apple Watch Nike+ (Series 2-present), Apple Watch Hermès (1st generation-Series 5, Series 6-present), and Apple Watch Edition (1st generation-Series 3, Series 5, Series 6-present). They are differentiated by combinations of cases, bands, and exclusive watch faces; Apple Watch comes with either aluminum or stainless steel cases, and various watch bands (only stainless steel was offered for Apple Watch 1st generation); Apple Watch Sport came with aluminum cases and sport bands or woven nylon bands; Apple Watch Nike+ comes with aluminum cases and Nike sport bands or sport loops; Apple Watch Hermès uses stainless steel cases and Hermès leather watch bands (also included is an exclusive Hermès orange sport band); and Apple Watch Edition came with ceramic cases and various bands (the 1st generation Apple Watch Edition used 18 karat yellow or rose gold). With the Series 5, the Edition tier was expanded with a new titanium case.

Apple Watch Series 1 models were previously only available with aluminum cases and sport bands.

As of Series 3, each Apple Watch model in aluminum, the least expensive casing, is available either with or without LTE cellular connectivity, while the models with the other casing materials available (stainless steel and sometimes ceramic and titanium) always include it.

Each model through Series 3 comes in a 38- or 42-millimeter body, with the larger size having a slightly larger screen and battery. The Series 4 was updated to 40- and 44-millimeter models, respectively. The Series 7 has been updated to 41- and 45-millimeter models. Each model has various color and band options. Featured Apple-made bands include colored sport bands, sport loop, woven nylon band, classic buckle, modern buckle, leather loop, Milanese loop, and a link bracelet.

Comparison of models

Support

Specifications

Collections and materials 

 1st generation only: Apple Watch was sold as "Apple Watch Sport" (Aluminum body) and "Apple Watch" (Stainless steel body). Later generations sold both body materials as "Apple Watch".

Reception 

Following the announcement, initial impressions from technology and watch industry observers were varied; the watch was praised by some for its "design, potential capabilities and eventual usefulness", while others offered criticism of these same aspects. Venture capitalist Marc Andreessen said he "can't wait" to try it, and Steve Jobs' biographer Walter Isaacson described it as "extremely cool" and an example of future technology that is "much more embedded into our lives". Evan Dashevsky of PC Magazine said it offered nothing new in terms of functionality compared to the Moto 360, except the customizable vibration notifications. In November 2014, Apple Watch was listed by Time as one of the 25 Best Inventions of 2014.

Initial reviews for the device have been generally positive with some caveats. Reviewers praised the watch's potential ability to integrate into everyday life and the overall design of the product, but noted issues of speed and price. Many reviewers described the watch as functional and convenient, while also noting failure to offer as much potential functionality as preceding smartphones. Farhad Manjoo of The New York Times mentioned the device's steep learning curve, stating it took him "three long, often confusing and frustrating days" to become accustomed to watchOS 1, but loved it thereafter. Some reviewers also compared it to competing products, such as Android Wear devices, and claimed "The Smartwatch Finally Makes Sense". Reviewers had mixed opinions on battery life though, with Geoffrey Fowler of The Wall Street Journal saying "the battery lives up to its all-day billing, but sometimes just barely," and others compared it to the Samsung Gear 2, which "strolls through three days of moderate usage." Tim Bradshaw of the Financial Times used several applications over a period of days. He concluded that there is no "killer application" so far besides telling the time, which is the basic function of a wristwatch anyhow.

When using the Apple Watch, some users have reported issues using the heart monitoring feature due to permanent skin conditions, including tattoos. The Watch uses photoplethysmography technology (PPG) that utilizes the green LED lights to measure heart rates. To gauge a user's heart rate, the watch flashes green light from the LEDs at the skin and records the amount of this light that is absorbed by the red pigment of the blood. Under certain circumstances, the skin may not allow for the light absorption to be read properly and thus provide inaccurate results.

Some users have complained that the logo and text on the back of the Apple Watch Sport model, primarily the space gray version, can be easily worn off.

Sales 

Financial analysts offered early sales estimates from a few million to as many as 5 million in the first year. Times Tim Bajarin summarized the breadth of reactions, writing that "there is not enough information yet to determine how this product will fare when it finally reaches the market next year".

Owing to the inadequacy of materials, the Apple Watch's delivery was delayed from its initial pre-order release date of April 10, 2015. As a result, only 22 percent of the pre-ordered Apple Watches were dispatched in the United States during the weekend after the release date. It is estimated Apple received almost one million Apple Watch pre-orders in the United States during the initial six hours of the pre-order period on April 10, 2015, after which it sold out and further orders would start delivering in June. A report later on by an analyst stated that Apple Watch was already a $10 billion business during its first year.

Apple has not disclosed any sales figures for the Apple Watch. An estimate by IDC states Apple shipped over 12 million units in 2015. In late 2016, a veteran of the Swiss watch industry said Apple sold about 20 million watches and had a market share of about 50 percent. Analysts estimate Apple sold 18 million watches in 2017, 31 million in 2019, and 34 million in 2020. In 2021, analysts estimated there were 100 million units in use.  

In 2020, Apple sold more watches than the entire Swiss watch industry– which includes Swatch and TAG Heuer among others.

Controversies 
In December 2019, Joseph Wiesel, a New York University cardiologist, sued Apple over allegations that the Apple Watch violates a patented method for detecting atrial fibrillation. Wiesel stated he had shared details of the patent with Apple in September 2017; the company refused to negotiate.

Following Apple's announcement of the Series 7, an independent software development company filed a lawsuit against Apple alleging inappropriate copying of the software keyboard functionality from an app that Apple had previously rejected from its App Store.

See also 
 List of iOS and iPadOS devices

Notes

References

External links 

  – official site

Apple Watch
Wearable devices
Computer-related introductions in 2015